Pt. Shri Ram Nagina Mishra was a former member of Lok Sabha and a leader of Bharatiya Janata Party. He was elected to Lok Sabha for six terms and four consecutive terms from Padrauna in Uttar Pradesh state in India.  He has been active in sugarcane cooperatives and involved in activities related to welfare of sugarcane farmers.

References 

Living people
India MPs 1980–1984
India MPs 1984–1989
India MPs 1991–1996
India MPs 1996–1997
India MPs 1998–1999
Uttar Pradesh MLAs 1969–1974
People from Kushinagar district
Lok Sabha members from Uttar Pradesh
Bharatiya Janata Party politicians from Uttar Pradesh
India MPs 1999–2004
Year of birth missing (living people)

Died: 16th December, 2021